Mariana Costa Checa (born 20 March 1986) is a Peruvian businesswoman, the founder of the non-profit web development organization Laboratoria. She has received international recognition for her work in technological outreach to women with limited resources. In 2019, she was elected as the independent director of Engie Energy Peru. She is also a member of the Inter-American Dialogue.

Early life and education
Mariana Costa Checa was born in Lima on 20 March 1986. Growing up in Peru and studying abroad since college, Mariana always wanted to help her country achieve equal opportunity and bring more women and more diversity to the tech industry. After graduating from the London School of Economics and Columbia University, Costa returned to her native Peru. She started a web development company, but when she noticed how few women were working in the field, she was inspired to create Laboratoria.

Laboratoria
Mariana is committed to addressing one of the toughest challenges facing the modern workforce: providing training and skills enhancement to elevate the playing field for underemployed women. Technology should be consumed equally by men and women, but if we only had men to develop the workforce, it wouldn't be able to meet the needs of women in the same way. That's why it's critical to get more women in the tech industry to provide better products that better serve women's needs. Second, as the economy and technology evolve, more and more jobs and positions are being replaced by automated machinery. These replaced jobs will be lower-skilled manual jobs, and women are overrepresented among these employees. So Mariana wants to reduce the negative social and economic impact that women will have in the fourth industrial revolution and give women the opportunity to work in the high-tech sector. Focusing on high-demand digital skills, such as web development and user experience design, it addresses the pain point of helping women who are already unemployed or in low-paying jobs to launch and develop promising careers in technology.

Laboratoria's innovative approach to a series of courses, the six-month intensive codecAdemy, requires students to dedicate 8 hours a day from one week to the next. They learn everything from content management systems, JavaScript and jQuery to HTML5 and CSS3 until students can create websites and games independently in a few weeks. (Gonzalez, 2016) In addition, Laboratoria works with hundreds of companies to ensure that course materials are kept up to date. After six months of skills training, these women are qualified and competitive to enter the job market. The program trains these young women to become skilled coders and focuses on the psychology and self-esteem of being a woman.

More than 2,400 women have graduated since 2019, with an employment rate of over 85%. Its graduates have worked for more than 950 companies worldwide, increasing their earnings by an average of 2.7 times and helping to close the talent and gender gap in tech. Mariana has been recognized several times for her work as a social entrepreneur. The BBC named her one of the most powerful women of 2016, and MIT named her one of Peru's leading innovators under 35. She also shared a panel with President Obama and Mark Zuckerberg at the 2016 Global Entrepreneurship Summit. (Anitab, 2020) She said that "With the digital economy transforming our region, we want to make sure women can benefit from its opportunities and be part of building our future as technology creators.

Recognition
In 2015, the Spanish edition of the MIT Technology Review named Costa to its list of Peru's innovators under 36.

She was one of 11 Latin American women among the BBC's 100 Women of 2016. During his presentation at that year's APEC Summit in Lima, Facebook founder Mark Zuckerberg highlighted the case of Laboratoria as an excellent initiative geared towards women in the region:

Barack Obama also had words of praise for Costa, stating that:

For International Women's Day 2019, Mattel chose Costa as one of 20 women to have a Barbie doll based on them.

References

External links

 
 Laboratoria

1986 births
Alumni of the London School of Economics
Columbia University alumni
Living people
People from Lima
Peruvian businesspeople
Peruvian women in business
Women in computing
Members of the Inter-American Dialogue
BBC 100 Women